A pantsuit, also known as a trouser suit outside the United States, is a woman's suit of clothing consisting of pants and a matching or coordinating coat or jacket.

Formerly, the prevailing fashion for women included some form of a coat,  paired with a skirt or dress—hence the name pantsuit.

History
The pantsuit was introduced in the 1920s, when a small number of women adopted a masculine style, including pantsuits, hats, canes and monocles. However, the term "trouser suit" had been used in Britain during the First World War, with reference to women working in heavy industry.

During the 1960s pantsuits for women became increasingly widespread. Designers such as Foale and Tuffin in London and Luba Marks in the United States were early promoters of trouser suits. In 1966 Yves Saint-Laurent introduced his Le Smoking, an evening pantsuit for women that mimicked a man's tuxedo. Whilst Saint-Laurent is often credited with introducing trouser suits, it was noted in 1968 that some of his pantsuits were very similar to designs that had already been offered by Luba Marks, and the London designer Ossie Clark had offered a trouser suit for women in 1964 that predated Saint Laurent's 'Le Smoking' design by two years. In Britain a social watershed was crossed in 1967 when Lady Chichester, wife of the navigator Sir Francis Chichester, wore a trouser suit when her husband was publicly knighted by Queen Elizabeth II.

Pantsuits were often deprecated as inappropriately masculine clothing for women. For example, until 1993, women were not permitted to wear pantsuits (or pants of any kind) on the United States Senate floor. In 1993, Senators Barbara Mikulski and Carol Moseley Braun wore pants onto the floor in defiance of the rule, and female support staff followed soon after, with the rule being amended later that year by Senate Sergeant-at-Arms Martha Pope to allow women to wear pants on the floor so long as they also wore a jacket, thus allowing pantsuits, among other types of clothing. 

Hillary Clinton, who is well known for wearing pantsuits, once referred to her presidential campaign staff as "The Sisterhood of the Traveling Pantsuits" (in her August 26, 2008 speech at the Democratic National Convention), a play on The Sisterhood of the Traveling Pants.

During the 2016 Presidential election, the pantsuit became a symbolic rallying cry among supporters of Hillary Clinton, many of whom donned pantsuits when they went to the polls to cast their ballots. This was in part due to the influence of a Facebook group of 2.9 million Hillary Clinton supporters called Pantsuit Nation.

See also
 Business wear
 Women and trousers

References

Suits (clothing)
History of clothing (Western fashion)
Hillary Clinton
1920s introductions